Sarvodaya Shiksha Sadan Senior Secondary School, Ellenabad is a private school in Ellenabad, India. It was established on 31 March 1988.

History

The first batch of the school was started and the school was up to 8th standard at that time. But construction of the school building was started at Sirsa road and in 1989 session, the school was shifted to Sirsa road. It is run by the Kalauna Education Society.

See also
Education in India
Literacy in India  
List of institutions of higher education in Haryana

References

External links 
School website

Private schools in Haryana
Sirsa district
1988 establishments in Haryana
Educational institutions established in 1988